The 1960 Edmonton Eskimos finished in 2nd place in the WIFU with a 10–6 record. They defeated the Calgary Stampeders in the Western Semi-Finals and the Winnipeg Blue Bombers in the Western Finals, and were defeated in the Grey Cup by the Ottawa Rough Riders.

Pre-season

Schedule

Regular season

Season standings

Roster

Playoffs

Grey Cup

1960 CFL Schenley Award Nominees

Jackie Parker was the WIFU nominee for CFL Most Outstanding Player Schenley Award, and won the award over Cookie Gilchrist of the Toronto Argonauts. Parker received 37 votes; Gilchrist received 33.

References

Edmonton Elks seasons
N. J. Taylor Trophy championship seasons
1960 Canadian Football League season by team